Vincent Mark Hilaire (born 10 October 1959) is a retired professional footballer who played in the Football League for Crystal Palace, Luton Town, Portsmouth, Leeds United, Stoke City and Exeter City. He was one of the first established black players in English football.

Career
Hilaire began his career with Crystal Palace as a 17-year-old in a 3–2 defeat at Lincoln City in March 1977 and rose to prominence with the side prophesied to be the "Team of the Eighties" after winning the Second Division championship title in 1978–79. He made over 255 league appearances for Crystal Palace, scoring 29 goals, and was Supporters 'Player of The Year' in 1979 and 1980. He also played one summer season in the NASL with the San Jose Earthquakes in 1982.

He joined Luton Town in July 1984 but made only six appearances before being transferred to Portsmouth a few months later in November 1984, where he made 146 appearances, scoring 25 goals. He moved to Leeds United in the summer of 1988, playing 51 games and scoring seven goals, then moved on to Stoke City in November 1989 on loan, joining them on a permanent transfer in November 1990. He later joined Exeter City in 1991 where he made 33 appearances, scoring four goals, in the 1991–92 season. He joined Southern League side Waterlooville in the summer of 1992, as joint player-manager along with his ex-Palace teammate Billy Gilbert, but he left the club and retired from football before the end of the season, leaving Gilbert as sole player-manager. He won international caps for England Youth, B and U21, and although he was a regular contender for senior international honours, he never quite made the full England squad.

He was a professional footballer at a time when racism was rife in English football. He said about a match at Vale Park in 1976, "After about 20 minutes, the manager, then Terry Venables, told me to go and have a warm-up. I came out of the dug-out, and I started jogging around the touchline. I couldn't believe the abuse that was coming at me... animal noises and all the names you think of calling a black person. Any name under the sun. And it frightened me a bit, so I couldn't wait to get back in the dug-out. And I thought, 'Well, if this is the sort of reception I'm going to get, then I don't really want to know'".

Personal life
Hilaire was name checked in the 1989 single by electronic band The Beloved in their Top 20 single "Hello".

His autobiography, Vince, was released in early 2018, co-written with Tom Masalona.

Career statistics
Source:

A.  The "Other" column constitutes appearances and goals in the Full Members Cup, Football League Trophy.

References

External links
 
 All Competitions Career Stats at Leeds-fans.org

1959 births
Living people
English footballers
England under-21 international footballers
English Football League players
English people of Dominica descent
Black British sportspeople
North American Soccer League (1968–1984) players
Crystal Palace F.C. players
San Jose Earthquakes (1974–1988) players
Luton Town F.C. players
Portsmouth F.C. players
Leeds United F.C. players
Stoke City F.C. players
Exeter City F.C. players
Waterlooville F.C. players
People from Forest Hill, London
Association football midfielders
English expatriate sportspeople in the United States
Expatriate soccer players in the United States
English expatriate footballers